Om Namah Shivaya (IAST: Om Namaḥ Śivāya) is one of the most popular Hindu mantras and the most important mantra in Shaivism. Namah Shivaya means "O salutations to the auspicious one!", or “adoration to Lord Shiva". It is called Siva Panchakshara, or Shiva Panchakshara or simply Panchakshara meaning the "five-syllable" mantra (viz., excluding the Om) and is dedicated to Shiva. This Mantra appears as 'Na' 'Ma' 'Śi' 'Vā' and 'Ya' in the Shri Rudram Chamakam which is a part of the Krishna Yajurveda and also in the Rudrashtadhyayi which is a part of the Shukla Yajurveda.

Origin of the mantra

This mantra is present in the Shri Rudram Chamakam, which is part of the Krishna Yajurveda. Shri Rudram Chamakam is taken from two chapters in fourth book of Taittiriya Samhita (TS 4.5, 4.7) of Krishna Yajurveda. Each chapter consist of eleven anuvaka or hymns. Name of both chapters are Namakam (chapter five) and Chamakam (chapter seven) respectively. The mantra appears without the initial Om in the eighth hymn of Namakam(TS 4.5.8.1) as Namaḥ śivāya ca śivatarāya ca. This means "Salutations unto Śiva the auspicious one, unto Śivatara the one than whom none more auspicious can exist".

This mantra also appears in the Rudrashtadhyayi, a part of the Shukla Yajurveda. In the Rudrashtadhyayi, the mantra appears in the 5th chapter (also known as Namakam) verse 41.

Translations among different traditions
Namah Shivaya means "Adoration to Lord Shiva"; this is preceded by the devotional syllable "Om".

In Siddha Shaivism and Shaiva Siddhanta Shaivism traditions, Namah Shivaya is considered as Pancha Bodha Tatva of Lord Shiva and his universal oneness of five elements:

 Na sound represents earth
 Ma sound represents water
 Śi sound represents fire
 Vā sound represents Pranic air
 Ya sound represents sky or ether

Its total meaning is that "universal consciousness is one".

In Shaiva Siddhanta, the five letters also represent:

 Na is the Lord's concealing grace
 Ma is the world
 Śi stands for Shiva
 Vā is His revealing grace
 Ya is the Ātman or soul

The Tirumantiram (a scripture in Shaiva Siddhanta) announces that "His feet are the letter Na. His navel is the letter Ma. His shoulders are the letter Śi. His mouth, the letter Vā. His radiant cranial center aloft is Ya. Thus is the five-lettered form of Shiva.": Tirumantiram 941. TM

In different scriptures

 The Mantra appears as 'Na' 'Ma' 'Śi' 'Vā' and 'Ya' in the Shri Rudram Chamakam which is a part of the Krishna Yajurveda. Thus predates the use of Shiva as a proper name, in the original context being an address to Lord Rudra (later Shiva), where Shiva retains its original meaning as an adjective, meaning "auspicious, benign, friendly", a euphemistic epithet of Rudra.
 The mantra appears in the Rudrashtadhyayi which is a part of the Shukla Yajurveda.
 Whole Panchakshara Stotra is dedicated to this mantra.
 Tirumantiram, a scripture written in Tamil language, speaks of the meaning of the mantra.
 It appears in the Shiva Purana in the chapter 1.2.10 (Shabda-Brahma Tanu) and in its Vidyeshvara samhita and in chapter 13 of the Vayaviya samhita of the Shiva Purana as Om Namaḥ Śivāya. It is also referenced many times throughout the Śiva Purana as the "5 syllable Mantra" and "6 syllable mantra" when including Om. 
 The Tamil Saivaite hymn Tiruvacakam begins with the five letters 'Na' 'Ma' 'Śi' 'Vā' and 'Ya'.

Usage

This mantra is repeated verbally or mentally, drawing the mind in upon itself to Lord Shiva's infinite, all-pervasive presence. Traditionally it is repeated 108 times a day while keeping count on a strand of rudraksha beads. This practice is called japa yoga. It is freely sung and chanted by everyone, but it is most powerful when given by one's guru. Before this initiation which is called mantra diksha, the guru will usually require a period of study. This initiation is often part of a temple ritual, such as a puja, japa, homa (fire ceremony), dhyana or and while smearing vibhuti. The guru whispers the mantra into the disciple's right ear, along with instructions on how and when to chant it.

Intended effect

This mantra is associated with qualities of prayer, divine-love, grace, truth, and blissfulness. When done correctly, it allegedly calms the mind and brings spiritual insight and knowledge. It also keeps the devotee close to Shiva and within His protective global fellowship.

Traditionally, it is accepted to be a powerful healing mantra beneficial for all physical and mental ailments. Soulful recitation of this mantra brings peace to the heart and joy to the Ātman or soul. Many Hindu teachers consider that the recitation of these syllables is sound therapy for the body and nectar for the Ātman. The nature of the mantra is the calling upon the higher self; it is the calling upon Shiva.

In popular culture

The mantra has gained wider use outside India as a result of Siddha Yoga, founded by Swami Muktananda, in which it is the main mantra used for meditation and chanting.

In the film Eat, Pray, Love: One Woman's Search for Everything Across Italy, India and Indonesia (2007), Elizabeth Gilbert explained that the first chant provided by her guru was "Om Namah Shivaya." Gilbert wrote that this meant "I honor the divinity within me."

See also
 Jangam
 Mahamrityunjaya Mantra
 Om Namo Narayanaya

References

Hindu mantras
Indian culture
Om mantras
Shaivism